Puelches Airport is a public use airport serving Puelches, a village in the La Pampa Province of Argentina. The runways are on the west side of the village.

See also

Transport in Argentina
List of airports in Argentina

References

External links 
OpenStreetMap - Puelches Airport
FallingRain - Puelches Airport
OurAirports - Puelches Airport

Airports in Argentina
La Pampa Province